Joseph W. Allen was an American politician from Maine. Allen, a Republican of Mount Vernon, served six years in the Maine Legislature between 1907 and 1916. Allen served one term in the Maine House of Representatives (1907–1908) and two terms in the Maine Senate (1913–1916). In the Senate, he was elected from the seventh senatorial district, which included Kennebec County, Maine.

References

Year of birth missing
Year of death missing
People from Mount Vernon, Maine
Republican Party members of the Maine House of Representatives
Republican Party Maine state senators
20th-century American politicians